Still Falls the Rain may refer to:

"Still Falls the Rain", a 1941 poem by Edith Sitwell
Canticle III: Still falls the rain, a 1954 composition by Benjamin Britten, based on the Sitwell poem, for tenor, French horn and piano
"Still Falls The Rain", a 1979 track on Manifesto (Roxy Music album)